was a Japanese daimyō of the early Edo period who ruled the Tatebayashi Domain. His court title was Tōtōmi no kami. Yasukatsu was the third son of Sakakibara Yasumasa, who was one of the four chief generals of Tokugawa Ieyasu. As Yasumasa's eldest son Tadamasa was given in adoption to the Osuga family, and the second son Tadanaga died young, Yasukatsu inherited his father's fief and became lord of Tatebayashi, which was rated at 100,000 koku in size. He took part in the winter Siege of Osaka, assisting the hard-pressed forces of Satake Yoshinobu. In the summer siege the following year, he was defeated in Sanada Yukimura's counterattack. Soon after the siege, Yasukatsu died at 26 of a bad case of hemorrhoids. After Yasukatsu's death his son Tadatsugu succeeded him; Tadatsugu's only son Katsumasa became a hatamoto.

Both Yasukatsu and his father Yasumasa are playable characters from the Eastern Army in the original Kessen.

References
Naramoto, Tatsuya (1992). Nihon no kassen: Monoshiri jiten. Tokyo: Shūfu-to-seikatsusha.
 "Tatebayashi-han" on Edo 300 HTML (accessed 16 Oct. 2008)
Turnbull, Stephen (2006). Osaka 1614–15: The Last Battle of the Samurai. (Oxford: Osprey Publishing), p. 38.

1590 births
1615 deaths
Fudai daimyo
Sakakibara clan